John Starkweather may refer to:
 John Amsden Starkweather, American professor of medical psychology
 John Converse Starkweather, general in the Union Army during the American Civil War